Pseudaneitea gravisulca is a species of air-breathing land slug, a terrestrial gastropod mollusc in the family Athoracophoridae, the leaf-veined slugs.

References

 Powell A. W. B., New Zealand Mollusca, William Collins Publishers Ltd, Auckland, New Zealand 1979 
 NZETC

Athoracophoridae
Gastropods of New Zealand
Gastropods described in 1963